{{Infobox film
| name           = My Pal Trigger
| image          = Mypaltripos.jpg
| caption        = Original film poster
| director       = Frank McDonald
| producer       = Armand Schaefer (associate producer)
| writer         = Screenplay:Jack TownleyJohn K. ButlerStory:Paul Gangelin
| starring       = Roy RogersDale EvansJack Holt<br/ >George "Gabby" HayesTriggerBob Nolan
| music          = R. Dale ButtsMort GlickmanCharles Maxwell
| cinematography = William Bradford  
| editing        = Harry Keller
| studio         = Republic Pictures 
| distributor    = Republic Pictures
| released       = 
| runtime        = 79 minutes54 minutes
| country        = United States
| language       = English
}}My Pal Trigger'' is a 1946 American Western musical film directed by Frank McDonald. The screenplay by Jack Townley and John K. Butler was based upon a story by Paul Gangelin. The film stars Roy Rogers, Dale Evans, George “Gabby” Hayes, Jack Holt, and Trigger in a story about the origin of Rogers' mount, and their deep and faithful bond. The film features several musical numbers for Rogers, Evans, and Bob Nolan and the Sons of the Pioneers.

It was filmed at Deerwood Stock Farm (Kentucky Park Farms) in Thousand Oaks, California.

Cast
 Roy Rogers as Roy Rogers, a horse dealer and peddler of leather goods
 Trigger (horse) as Trigger, the son of Kendrick’s Golden Sovereign and Roy’s Lady
 George "Gabby" Hayes as Gabby Kendrick, owner of the Golden Horse Ranch and Golden Sovereign, a stallion
 Dale Evans as Susan Kendrick, his daughter
 Bob Nolan as Bob, a Kendrick ranch hand 
 Sons of the Pioneers as musicians and Kendrick ranch hands
 Jack Holt as Brett Scoville, a wealthy rancher, horse breeder, and owner of the El Dorado casino and nightclub
 LeRoy Mason as Carson, Scoville’s henchman
 Roy Barcroft as Hunter, Scoville’s henchman
 Kenne Duncan as a croupier at Scoville’s nightclub
 Sam Flint as the Sheriff of El Dorado County
 Ralph Sanford as Al, an auctioneer
 Francis McDonald as Pete, a storekeeper
 Harlan Briggs as Dr. Bentley, a veterinarian
 William Haade as Davis

Music
 “She’s Havin’ Too Much Fun” (sung by Rogers and Evans)
 “Old Faithful” (sung by Rogers)

See also
 List of films in the public domain in the United States

References

External links
 
 
 
 
 

Films about horses
1946 films
1946 Western (genre) films
Republic Pictures films
Films directed by Frank McDonald
American Western (genre) films
American black-and-white films
Films shot in Ventura County, California
1940s English-language films
1940s American films